Girolamo Saladini (Lucca, 22 July 1735 – Bologna, 1 June 1813) was an Italian mathematician. He was one of the brightest pupils of the Italian mathematician Vincenzo Riccati, with whom he had a fruitful collaboration: together they wrote the Institutiones Analyticae, in three volumes published in Bologna in 1765–1767 with th publisher Stamperia di San Tommaso d'Aquino. Saladini edited the Italian translation, published in 1775 with the same publisher.

In a memoir written by himself and dated 1808, entitled Sul principio delle velocità virtuali ("On the principle of virtual speeds"), starting from the work carried out by the mathematicians Vittorio Fossombroni and Vincenzo Angiulli, he tried to prove the Principle of Virtual Work by trying to avoid the main difficulties, including the presence of constraints.

Works 
 
 
 
 
 
 Sul principio delle velocità virtuali, Memoria dell'Istituto Nazionale Italiano, t. II, par. la, pp. 399–420, Bologna, 1808.

References 

1735 births
1813 deaths
People from Lucca
18th-century Italian mathematicians
19th-century Italian mathematicians